Richard Kačala (born 1 March 1991 in Prešov) is a Slovak football midfielder.

1. FC Tatran Prešov 
He made his official debut for 1. FC Tatran Prešov on 9 March 2013, playing the last 5 minutes in a 0–0 home draw against MŠK Žilina, entering in as a substitute in place of Peter Lipták.

References

External links 
 1. FC Tatran Prešov profile
 
 Corgoň Liga profile

1991 births
Living people
Association football midfielders
Slovak footballers
1. FC Tatran Prešov players
Sandecja Nowy Sącz players
MFK Lokomotíva Zvolen players
FC VSS Košice players
Slovak Super Liga players
Expatriate footballers in Poland
Sportspeople from Prešov